Lake Platte is a lake in South Dakota, in the United States.

Lake Platte took its name from nearby Platte, South Dakota.

See also
List of lakes in South Dakota

References

Lakes of South Dakota
Bodies of water of Charles Mix County, South Dakota